Daniel Sestrajcic (born 1976) is a Swedish politician and former member of the Riksdag, the national legislature. A member of the Left Party, he represented Malmö Municipality between September 2014 and August 2017.

Sestrajcic has been a member of the municipal council in Malmö Municipality since 2019. He was amongst a group a protestors who, on 8 October 2015, tried to prevent the police from removing a cam set-up outside the Swedish Migration Agency's offices in Malmö by Palestinian refugees. He was convicted of disobeying law enforcement and fined SEK 25,000.

References

1976 births
Living people
Members of the Riksdag 2014–2018
Members of the Riksdag from the Left Party (Sweden)
Politicians from Malmö